John Hoskins may refer to:

 John Hoskins (footballer), (born 1931), English footballer
 John Hoskins (officer) (1898–1964), American navy admiral during World War II and Korean War
 John Hoskins (painter) (died 1664), English miniature painter
 John Hoskins (poet) (1566–1638), English poet
 Johnnie Hoskins (1892–1987), U.K. speedway rider

See also
 John Hoskins Stone (1749–1804), American painter and politician
 John Hoskin (1921–1990), British sculptor
 John Hosking (disambiguation)
 John Hoskyns (disambiguation)